The 2020 United States House of Representatives elections in Texas was held on November 3, 2020, to elect the 36 U.S. representatives from the state of Texas, one from each of the state's 36 congressional districts. The elections coincided with the 2020 U.S. presidential election, as well as other elections to the House of Representatives, elections to the U.S. Senate and various state and local elections. Primaries were held on March 3 and run-offs were held on July 14.

During the election cycle, a number of House races were considered vulnerable by Democrats and polls. However, in the wake of the election, Republicans were able to retain control over all of those seats. The Democratic-held 15th district also became unexpectedly competitive, with incumbent Representative Vicente Gonzalez attaining a narrow win over the Republican challenger. The Republican wins were attributed to President Donald Trump appearing on the ballot and his unexpectedly strong support from Latino voters, as well as the Democrats' campaigning methods.

Ballot litigation
Some Green Party candidates were removed from the ballot due to a failure to pay filing fees. However, in September 2020, the Texas Supreme Court rejected a Republican attempt to remove 44 Libertarian Party candidates from the November 2020 general election ballot because they failed to pay filing fees. The court ruled that the Republicans missed the state Election Code's deadline to raise such a challenge.

Results summary

Statewide

District
Results of the 2020 United States House of Representatives elections in Texas by district:

District 1

The 1st district encompasses Deep East Texas, taking in Tyler, Lufkin, Nacogdoches, Longview, and Marshall. The incumbent is Republican Louie Gohmert, who was re-elected with 72.3% of the vote in 2018.

Republican primary

Candidates

Nominee
Louie Gohmert, incumbent U.S. Representative

Eliminated in primary
Johnathan Davidson, data architect

Primary results

Democratic primary

Candidates

Nominee
Hank Gilbert, rancher and businessman

Primary results

Endorsements

General election

Predictions

Results

District 2

The 2nd district is based in northern and western Houston. The incumbent is Republican Dan Crenshaw, who was elected with 52.8% of the vote in 2018.

Republican primary

Candidates

Nominee
Dan Crenshaw, incumbent U.S. Representative

Primary results

Democratic primary

Candidates

Nominee
 Sima Ladjevardian, attorney, philanthropist, fundraiser, and advisor to Beto O'Rourke during his 2018 U.S. Senate campaign and 2020 presidential campaign.

Withdrew before runoff
 Elisa Cardnell, U.S. Navy veteran and science teacher

Eliminated in primary
 Travis Olsen, former Homeland Security Department employee

Primary results

Runoff results
No runoff was held after runoff-advanced candidate Elisa Cardnell suspended her campaign and supported Ladjevardian.

Endorsements

General election

Predictions

Results

District 3

The 3rd district is based in the suburbs north and northeast of Dallas, encompassing a large portion of Collin County including McKinney, Plano, and Frisco, as well as Collin County's share of Dallas itself. The incumbent is Republican Van Taylor, who was elected with 54.2% of the vote in 2018.

Republican primary

Candidates

Nominee
Van Taylor, incumbent U.S. Representative

Primary results

Democratic primary

Candidates

Nominee
Lulu Seikaly, attorney

Eliminated in runoff
Sean McCaffity, trial attorney

Eliminated in primary
Tanner Do, activist and insurance adjuster

Withdrawn
Lorie Burch, attorney and nominee for Texas's 3rd congressional district in 2018

Primary results

Runoff results

Libertarian primary

Nominee
Christopher Claytor

General election

Predictions

Polling

with Generic Republican and Generic Democrat

Results

District 4

The 4th district encompasses Northeastern Texas taking in counties along the Red River and spreading to the parts of the northeastern exurbs of the Dallas–Fort Worth metro area. The incumbent is Republican John Ratcliffe, who was elected with 75.7% of the vote in 2018.

President Trump nominated Ratcliffe to succeed Dan Coats as the Director of National Intelligence in February 2020. The Senate confirmed his nomination in May, and Ratcliffe resigned from the House. Republicans selected a new nominee on August 8.

Republican primary

Candidates

Nominee
Pat Fallon, State Senator for Texas District 30, from Denton County, Texas

Eliminated at convention
Trace Johannesen, Rockwall city councilman
Jim Pruitt, mayor of Rockwall
Travis Ransom, mayor of Atlanta
Robert West, farmer from Cooper, Texas
Jason Ross, former district chief of staff for U.S. Representative John Ratcliffe

Withdrawn
John Ratcliffe, incumbent U.S. Representative

Primary results

Democratic primary

Candidates

Nominee
Russell Foster, IT technician

Primary results

General election

Predictions

Results

District 5

The 5th district takes in the eastern edge of Dallas, as well as the surrounding rural areas. The incumbent is Republican Lance Gooden, who was elected with 62.3% of the vote in 2018.

Republican primary

Candidates

Nominee
 Lance Gooden, incumbent U.S. Representative

Eliminated in primary
 Don Hill, U.S. Army veteran

Primary results

Democratic primary

Candidates

Nominee
Carolyn Salter, former mayor of Palestine

General election

Predictions

Results

District 6

The 6th district takes in parts of Arlington and rural areas south of Dallas including Ellis County. The incumbent is Republican Ron Wright, who was elected with 53.1% of the vote in 2018.

Republican primary

Candidates

Nominee
Ron Wright, incumbent U.S. Representative

Primary results

Democratic primary

Candidates

Nominee
Stephen Daniel, attorney

Endorsements

Primary results

General election

Predictions

Polling

with Generic Republican and Generic Democrat

Results

District 7

The 7th district covers western Houston and its suburbs. The incumbent is Democrat Lizzie Fletcher, who flipped the district and was elected with 52.5% of the vote in 2018.

Democratic primary

Candidates

Nominee
Lizzie Fletcher, incumbent U.S. Representative

Primary results

Republican primary

Candidates

Nominee
Wesley Hunt, U.S. Army veteran

Eliminated in primary
Maria Espinoza, founder of The Remembrance Project
Kyle Preston, energy consultant
Laique Rehman, businessman
Cindy Siegel, former mayor of Bellaire and former board member of the Harris County Metropolitan Transit Authority

Declined
Ed Emmett, former Harris County judge

Primary results

General election

Polling

with Generic Opponent

Predictions

Endorsements

Results

District 8

The 8th district encompasses the suburbs and exurbs north of Houston, taking in Spring, The Woodlands, Conroe, and Huntsville. The incumbent is Republican Kevin Brady, who was re-elected with 73.4% of the vote in 2018.

Republican primary

Candidates

Nominee
 Kevin Brady, incumbent U.S. Representative

Eliminated in primary
 Melissa Esparza-Mathis, U.S. Army veteran
Kirk Osborn, consultant

Primary results

Democratic primary

Candidates

Nominee
Elizabeth Hernandez, accounts payable associate

Eliminated in primary
Laura Jones, realtor

Primary results

General election

Predictions

Results

District 9

The 9th district encompasses southwestern Houston. The incumbent is Democrat Al Green, who was re-elected with 89.1% of the vote in 2018, without major-party opposition.

Democratic primary

Candidates

Nominee
Al Green, incumbent U.S. Representative

Eliminated in primary
Melissa Wilson-Williams, real estate broker

Primary results

Republican primary

Candidates

Nominee
Johnny Teague, rancher

Eliminated in primary
Julian Martinez, auto repairman
Jon Menefee, IT consultant

Primary results

General election

Predictions

Results

District 10

The 10th district stretches from northwest Harris County to northern Austin and Pflugerville. The incumbent is Republican Michael McCaul, who was re-elected in 2018 with 51.1% of the vote to Democrat Mike Siegel's 47.8%, the closest contest McCaul had faced.

Republican primary

Candidates

Nominee
Michael McCaul, incumbent U.S. Representative

Primary results

Democratic primary

Candidates

Nominee
Mike Siegel, attorney and nominee for Texas's 10th congressional district in 2018

Eliminated in runoff
Pritesh Gandhi, physician

Eliminated in primary
Shannon Hutcheson, attorney

Endorsements

Primary results

Runoff results

General election

Endorsements

Polling

with Shannon Hutcheson

with Generic Democrat and Generic Republican

Predictions

Results

District 11

The 11th district is based in midwestern Texas, including Lamesa, Midland, Odessa, San Angelo, Granbury, and Brownwood. The incumbent is Republican Mike Conaway, who was re-elected with 80.1% of the vote in 2018, subsequently announced he would not seek re-election on July 31, 2019.

Republican primary

Candidates

Nominee
August Pfluger, former national security advisor to President Donald Trump and U.S. Air Force veteran

Eliminated in primary
Gene Barber, U.S. Army veteran
Brandon Batch, businessman
Jamie Berryhill, businessman and founder of Mission Messiah Women & Children's Program
Cynthia J. Breyman, banker
J.D. Faircloth, former mayor of Midland
Casey Gray, U.S. Navy veteran
J. Ross Lacy, Midland city councilman
Ned Luscombe, registered nurse
Robert Tucker, retiree
Wesley Virdell, Air Force veteran, former trucking company owner

Declined
Richard Barrett, physician
Mike Conaway, incumbent U.S. Representative
Mike Lang, state representative
Jerry Morales, mayor of Midland
Brooks Landgraf, state representative

Primary results

Democratic primary

Candidates

Nominee
Jon Mark Hogg, lawyer

Third parties

Candidates

Declared
Wacey Alpha Cody (Libertarian), competitive horse rider

Endorsements

General election

Predictions

Results

District 12

The 12th district is located in the Dallas–Fort Worth metroplex, and takes in Parker County and western Tarrant County, including parts of Fort Worth and its inner suburbs of North Richland Hills, Saginaw, and Haltom City. The incumbent is Republican Kay Granger, who was re-elected with 64.3% of the vote in 2018.

Republican primary

Candidates

Nominee
Kay Granger, incumbent U.S. Representative

Eliminated in primary
Chris Putnam, businessman and former Colleyville city councilman

Endorsements

Polling

Primary results

Democratic primary

Candidates

Nominee
 Lisa Welch, college professor

Eliminated in primary
Danny Anderson, aircraft assembler

Primary results

Third parties

Candidates

Declared
Trey Holcomb (Libertarian), conservative activist, educator and former high school football and baseball coach

Endorsements

General election

Predictions

Results

District 13

The 13th district encompasses most of the Texas Panhandle, containing the cities of Amarillo, Gainesville and Wichita Falls. The incumbent is Republican Mac Thornberry, who was re-elected with 81.5% of the vote in 2018. On September 30, 2019, Thornberry announced he would not be seeking re-election.

Republican primary

Candidates

Nominee
Ronny Jackson, Retired Navy Rear Admiral, former Physician to the President, and former nominee for Secretary of Veterans Affairs

Eliminated in runoff
Josh Winegarner, director of governmental relations for the Texas Cattle Feeders Association and former aide to U.S. Senator John Cornyn and former U.S. Senator Phil Gramm

Eliminated in primary
Catherine "I Swear" Carr, education-counseling artist
Jamie Culley, business consultant
Chris Ekstrom, businessman and activist
Jason Foglesong, Potter County Republican precinct chairman
Lee Harvey, Wichita County commissioner
Elaine Hays, Amarillo city councilwoman and candidate for Texas's 13th congressional district in 2014
Richard Herman, former Potter County justice of the peace
Diane Knowlton, attorney
Matt McArthur, construction manager
Mark Neese, educator
Asusena Resendiz, former president and CEO of the Fort Worth Hispanic Chamber of Commerce
Vance Snider II, U.S. Army veteran and railroad conductor
Monique Worthy, activist

Withdrew
 Kevin McInturff, non-profit worker

Declined
Pam Barlow, veterinarian and candidate for Texas's 13th congressional district in 2012 and 2014
Jason Brinkley, Cooke County judge
Ginger Nelson, mayor of Amarillo
Four Price, state representative (running for re-election to Texas House)
Trey Sralla, former Wichita Falls school board president
Mac Thornberry, incumbent U.S. Representative

Endorsements

Primary results

Polling

Runoff results

Democratic primary

Candidates

Nominee
Gus Trujillo, office manager

Eliminated in runoff
Greg Sagan, U.S. Navy veteran and nominee for Texas's 13th congressional district in 2018

Eliminated in primary
Timothy W. Gassaway, retiree

Primary results

Runoff results
Greg Sagan withdrew from the race on March 12, 2020, but remained on the ballot in the runoff.

Libertarian primary

Candidates

Declared
Jack B. Westbrook, retiree and nominee for Texas's 31st state senate district in 2018

General election

Predictions

Results

District 14

The 14th district takes in the southern and southeastern region of Greater Houston, including Galveston, Jefferson County and southern Brazoria County. The incumbent is Republican Randy Weber, who was re-elected with 59.2% of the vote in 2018.

Republican primary

Candidates

Nominee
Randy Weber, incumbent U.S. Representative

Eliminated in primary
Joshua Foxworth, businessman

Primary results

Democratic primary

Candidates

Nominee
Adrienne Bell, nominee for Texas's 14th congressional district in 2018

Eliminated in primary
Sanjanetta Barnes
Eddie Fisher
Robert Thomas, West Columbia city councilman
Mikal Williams, attorney

Primary results

General election

Endorsements

Predictions

Results

District 15

The 15th district stretches from McAllen in the Rio Grande Valley, northward into rural counties in the Greater San Antonio area. The incumbent is Democrat Vicente Gonzalez, who was re-elected with 59.7% of the vote in 2018.

Democratic primary

Candidates

Nominee
Vicente Gonzalez, incumbent U.S. Representative

Primary results

Republican primary

Candidates

Nominee
Monica de la Cruz-Hernandez, insurance agent

Eliminated in runoff
Ryan Krause, candidate for Texas's 21st congressional district in 2018

Eliminated in primary
Tim Westley, university instructor and nominee for Texas's 15th congressional district in 2016 and 2018

Primary results

Runoff results

General election

Predictions

Results

District 16

The 16th district is located entirely within El Paso County, taking in El Paso, Horizon City, and Anthony. The incumbent is Democrat Veronica Escobar, who was elected with 68.5% of the vote in 2018.

Democratic primary

Candidates

Nominee
Veronica Escobar, incumbent U.S. Representative

Primary results

Republican primary

Candidates

Nominee
Irene Armendariz-Jackson, realtor

Eliminated in runoff
Samuel Williams, U.S. Army veteran

Eliminated in primary
Anthony Aguero, videographer
Jaime Arriola Jr., nurse
Patrick Cigarruista, financial advisor

Primary results

Runoff results

General election

Predictions

Results

District 17

The 17th district covers parts of suburban north Austin stretching to rural central Texas, including Waco and Bryan-College Station. The incumbent is Republican Bill Flores, who was re-elected with 56.8% of the vote in 2018. On September 4, 2019, Flores announced that he will not be running for re-election to spend more time with his family.

Republican primary

Candidates

Nominee
 Pete Sessions, former U.S. Representative for Texas's 32nd congressional district (2003–2019)

Eliminated in runoff
 Renée Swann, healthcare executive

Eliminated in primary
 Ahmad Adnan, financial advisor
 Scott Bland, construction company owner
 George Hindman, rocket scientist
 Todd Kent, former assistant dean for Texas A&M University at Qatar
 Laurie Godfrey McReynolds, real estate agent
 Jeff Oppenheim, U.S. Army veteran
 Kristen Alamo Rowin, real estate agent
 David Saucedo, safety coordinator
 Trent Sutton, U.S. Marine Corps veteran
 Elianor Vessali, College Station city councilwoman

Declined
James Edge, district director for U.S. Representative Bill Flores
Wes Lloyd, Brazos River Authority board member
Bill Flores, incumbent U.S. Representative

Endorsements

Primary results

Runoff results

Democratic primary

Candidates

Nominee
Rick Kennedy, software developer and nominee for Texas's 17th congressional district in 2018

Eliminated in runoff
David Anthony Jaramillo, U.S. Marine Corps veteran, and recipient of the Presidential Service Badge

Eliminated in primary
William Foster III, educator and former NASA employee

Primary results

Runoff results

Third parties

Candidates

Declared
Ted Brown (Libertarian), small business owner and insurance claims adjuster

General election

Predictions

Polling

Results

District 18

The 18th district is based in Downtown Houston and takes in the heavily black areas of Central Houston. The incumbent is Democrat Sheila Jackson Lee, who was re-elected with 75.3% of the vote in 2018.

Democratic primary

Candidates

Nominee
Sheila Jackson Lee, incumbent U.S. Representative

Eliminated in primary
Michael Allen, landscape architect
Donovan Boson, public administrator
Marc Flores, construction manager
Jerry Ford Sr., businessman
Stevens Orozco, teacher

Primary results

Republican primary

Candidates

Nominee
Wendell Champion, attorney and U.S Army veteran

Eliminated in runoff
Robert Cadena, businessman

Eliminated in primary
Nellie Heiksell, minister
T.C. Manning, service technician
Nathan Milliron, attorney
Ava Reynero Pate, candidate for Texas's 18th congressional district in 2016 and 2018

Primary results

Runoff results

General election

Predictions

Results

District 19

The 19th district encompasses rural West Texas, taking in Lubbock. The incumbent is Republican Jodey Arrington, who was re-elected with 75.2% of the vote in 2018.

Republican primary

Candidates

Nominee
Jodey Arrington, incumbent U.S. Representative

Eliminated in primary
Vance Boyd, stuntman

Not on ballot
Kezia Tunnell

Primary results

Democratic primary

Candidates

Nominee
Tom Watson, attorney

Primary results

General election

Predictions

Results

District 20

The 20th district encompasses downtown San Antonio. The incumbent is Democrat Joaquin Castro, who was re-elected with 80.9% of the vote in 2018 without major-party opposition.

Democratic primary

Candidates

Nominee
 Joaquin Castro, incumbent U.S. Representative

Eliminated in primary
 Rob Hostetler, U.S. Air Force veteran
 Justin Lecea, co-op manager

Primary results

Republican primary

Candidates

Nominee
 Mauro Garza, club owner and candidate for Texas's 21st congressional district in 2018

Eliminated in runoff
 Gary Allen, retired teacher

Eliminated in primary
 Dominick Dina, real estate agent
 Anita Kegley, construction business owner
 Tammy Orta, registered nurse

Primary results

Runoff results

General election

Predictions

Results

District 21

The 21st district extends from north San Antonio to central and south Austin, taking in rural parts of the Texas Hill Country. The Democratic nominee is former Texas state senator and 2014 gubernatorial nominee, Wendy Davis. Perennial candidate Arthur DiBianca was nominated by the Libertarian party convention on March 21, 2020. The incumbent is Republican Chip Roy, who was elected with 50.2% of the vote in 2018.

Republican primary

Candidates

Nominee
 Chip Roy, incumbent U.S. Representative

Primary results

Democratic primary

Candidates

Declared
 Wendy Davis, former state senator and nominee for Governor of Texas in 2014

Eliminated in runoff
 Jennie Lou Leeder, nominee for Texas's 11th congressional district in 2018

Primary results

Endorsements

General election

Predictions

Polling

with Generic Democrat and Generic Republican

Results

District 22

The 22nd district encompasses the south-central Greater Houston metropolitan area, including the southern Houston suburbs of Sugar Land, Pearland, and Webster. Incumbent Republican Pete Olson was re-elected with 51.4% of the vote in 2018, his narrowest victory ever, and announced on July 25, 2019, that he would not seek re-election.

Republican primary

Candidates

Nominee
 Troy Nehls, Fort Bend County sheriff

Eliminated in runoff
 Kathaleen Wall, GOP donor and candidate for Texas's 2nd congressional district in 2018

Eliminated in primary
 Pierce Bush, CEO of Big Brothers Big Sisters Houston affiliate, grandson of former U.S. President George H. W. Bush, and nephew of former U.S. president and former Governor of Texas George W. Bush
 Jonathan Camarillo, U.S. Marine Corps veteran
 Douglas Haggard, attorney
 Aaron Hermes, professional sitar player
 Greg Hill, Brazoria County court judge and former Pearland city councilman
 Matt Hinton, finance manager
 Dan Mathews, engineer and businessman
 Diana Miller, real estate broker
 Shandon Phan, attorney
 Bangar Reddy, former president of the India Culture Center of Houston
 Joe Walz, U.S. Army veteran and businessman

Declined
Roger Clemens, former Major League Baseball pitcher for Houston Astros
Pete Olson, incumbent U.S. Representative
John Zerwas, state representative

Endorsements

Primary results

Polling

Runoff results

Democratic primary

Candidates

Nominee
Sri Preston Kulkarni, former diplomat and former Democratic nominee for Texas's 22nd congressional district in 2018

Eliminated in primary
Chris Fernandez, retiree
Nyanza Davis Moore, television news commentator and attorney
Carmine Petricco III, former electrician
Derrick Reed, Pearland city councilman

Endorsements

Primary results

General election

Predictions

Polling

with Generic Democrat and Generic Republican

Endorsements

Results

District 23

The 23rd district covers southwestern Texas, including the Big Bend, the southern and western San Antonio suburbs, and the southwestern El Paso suburbs. The incumbent Republican Will Hurd, who was re-elected with 49.2% of the vote in 2018, subsequently announced he would not seek re-election on August 1, 2019.

Republican primary

Candidates

Nominee
Tony Gonzales, U.S. Navy veteran

Eliminated in runoff
Raul Reyes, U.S. Air Force veteran

Eliminated in primary
Alma Arredondo-Lynch, dentist and candidate for Texas's 23rd congressional district in 2018
 Darwin Boedeker, gun show promoter
 Cecil Jones, businessman
Jeff McFarlin, businessman
Sharon Thomas, attorney and member of the Texas Commission on Law Enforcement
 Alia Ureste, candidate for Texas's 16th congressional district in 2018
Ben Van Winkle, technology manager

Declined
Pete Flores, state senator
Will Hurd, incumbent U.S. Representative
JW Lown, former mayor of San Angelo

Endorsements

Primary results

Runoff results

Democratic primary

Candidates

Nominee
Gina Ortiz Jones, U.S. Air Force veteran and nominee for Texas's 23rd congressional district in 2018

Eliminated in primary
Rosalinda Ramos Abuabara, activist
Jaime Escuder, attorney
Ricardo Madrid, community health worker
Efrain Valdez, former mayor of Del Rio and former Val Verde County judge

Declined
Cesar Blanco, state representative

Endorsements

Primary results

General election

Endorsements

Predictions

Polling

with Generic Democrat and Generic Republican

Results

District 24

The 24th district encompasses the suburbs north of Fort Worth and Dallas, including Grapevine, Carrollton, parts of Irving, and northwestern Dallas. The incumbent is Republican Kenny Marchant, who was re-elected with 50.6% of the vote in 2018. Marchant announced he would not seek re-election on August 5, 2019.

Republican primary

Candidates

Nominee
Beth Van Duyne, former U.S. Department of Housing and Urban Development official and former mayor of Irving

Eliminated in primary
Sunny Chaparala, realtor
David Fegan, property manager
Jeron Liverman, realtor
Desi Maes, U.S. Army Ranger veteran

Declined
Konni Burton, former state senator
Kenny Marchant, incumbent U.S. Representative

Endorsements

Primary results

Democratic primary

Candidates

Nominee
Candace Valenzuela, former Carrollton-Farmers Branch school board member

Eliminated in runoff
Kim Olson, retired Air Force Colonel, and nominee for Texas Commissioner of Agriculture in 2018

Eliminated in primary
John Biggan, cognitive neuroscientist, teacher, and candidate for Texas's 24th congressional district in 2018
Richard Fleming, former Carrollton-Farmers Branch school board trustee
Jan McDowell, accountant and nominee for Texas's 24th congressional district in 2016 and 2018
Sam Vega, art director

Withdrew
Crystal Fletcher, lawyer
Will Fisher, former candidate for Texas's 26th congressional district in 2018

Endorsements

Polling

Primary results

Polling

Runoff results

Third parties

Candidates

Declared
Mark Bauer (Independent), journalist
Steve Kuzmich (Independent), attorney

General election

Predictions

Polling

with Generic Republican and Generic Democrat

Endorsements

Results

District 25

The 25th district runs from north Austin through rural areas of Texas Hill Country northward into southern Fort Worth suburbs. The incumbent is Republican Roger Williams, who was re-elected with 53.5% of the vote in 2018.

Republican primary

Candidates

Nominee
Roger Williams, incumbent U.S. Representative

Eliminated in primary
Keith Neuendorff, software engineer

Primary results

Democratic primary

Candidates

Nominee
Julie Oliver, health care advocate, attorney, and nominee for Texas's 25th congressional district in 2018

Eliminated in primary
Heidi Sloan, community organizer and farmer

Endorsements

Primary results

General election

Endorsements

Predictions

Polling

Results

District 26

The 26th district is based in the northern portion of the Dallas–Fort Worth metroplex, centering on Denton County. The incumbent is Republican Michael C. Burgess, who was re-elected with 59.4% of the vote in 2018.

Republican primary

Candidates

Nominee
Michael C. Burgess, incumbent U.S. Representative

Eliminated in primary
Michael Armstrong, pastor
Jason Mrochek, U.S. Army veteran and founder of the Patriot Coalition
Jack Wyman, activist

Primary results

Democratic primary

Candidates

Nominee
Carol Iannuzzi, activist

Eliminated in primary
Neil Durrance, former Denton city councilman and nominee for Texas's 26th congressional district in 2010
Mat Pruneda, financial analyst, former candidate for Texas House District 64 in 2018

Primary results

General election

Predictions

Results

District 27

The 27th district stretches across the Coastal Bend, from Corpus Christi up to Bay City. The incumbent is Republican Michael Cloud, who was re-elected with 60.3% of the vote in 2018.

Republican primary

Candidates

Nominee
Michael Cloud, incumbent U.S. Representative

Primary results

Democratic primary

Candidates

Nominee
Ricardo "Rick" De La Fuente, businessman

Eliminated in primary
Charlie Jackson, businessman

Primary results

Libertarian primary

Candidates

Declared
Phil Gray, businessman

General election

Predictions

Results

District 28

The 28th district is based in the Laredo area and stretches north of the Rio Grande Valley into east San Antonio. The incumbent is Democrat Henry Cuellar, who was re-elected with 84.4% of the vote in 2018 without major-party opposition.

Democratic primary

Candidates

Nominee
Henry Cuellar, incumbent U.S. Representative

Eliminated in primary
Jessica Cisneros, attorney

Endorsements

Primary results

Republican primary

Candidates

Nominee
Sandra Whitten, Sunday school teacher

Primary results

Third parties

Candidates

Declared
Bekah Congdon, Libertarian nominee for Texas's 28th state senate district

General election

Predictions

Results

District 29

The 29th district encompasses parts of eastern Houston, taking in the heavily Latino areas of the city. The incumbent is Democrat Sylvia Garcia, who was elected with 75.1% of the vote in 2018.

Democratic primary

Candidates

Nominee
Sylvia Garcia, incumbent U.S. Representative

Primary results

Republican primary

Candidates

Nominee
Jaimy Z. Blanco, real estate investor and candidate for Texas's 29th congressional district in 2018

Eliminated in primary
Robert Schafranek, sales associate and candidate for Texas's 29th congressional district in 2016 and 2018

Primary results

General election

Predictions

Results

District 30

The 30th district encompasses Downtown Dallas as well as South Dallas. The incumbent is Democrat Eddie Bernice Johnson, who was re-elected with 91.1% of the vote in 2018 without major-party opposition.

Democratic primary

Candidates

Nominee
Eddie Bernice Johnson, incumbent U.S. Representative

Eliminated in primary
Hasani Burton, activist
Barbara Mallory Caraway, former state representative and perennial candidate
Shenita Cleveland, community organizer

Primary results

Republican primary

Candidates

Nominee
Tre Pennie, Dallas police sergeant

Primary results

General election

Predictions

Results

District 31

The 31st district encompasses northern Austin to Temple, including Williamson and Bell counties. The incumbent is Republican John Carter, who was re-elected with 50.6% of the vote in 2018.

Republican primary

Candidates

Nominee
John Carter, incumbent U.S. Representative

Eliminated in primary
Abhiram Garapati, real estate investor
Christopher Wall, police officer
Mike Williams, retired firefighter

Primary results

Democratic primary

Candidates

Nominee
Donna Imam, computer engineer

Eliminated in runoff
Christine Eady Mann, family practice physician and candidate for Texas's 31st congressional district in 2018

Eliminated in primary
Michael Edward Grimes, attorney
Eric Hanke, singer-songwriter (endorsed Imam)
Dan Janjigian, former Olympic bobsledder and actor (The Room) (endorsed Imam)
Tammy Young, Round Rock city councilwoman (endorsed Imam)

Endorsements

Primary results

Runoff results

Third parties

Candidates

Declared
Clark Patterson (Libertarian), photographer and videographer and candidate for Texas's 35th congressional district in 2018

Declined
Trip Seibold (Libertarian), former software engineer (running for Texas State Board of Education district 10)

General election

Endorsements

Predictions

Polling

with Generic Democrat and Generic Republican

Results

District 32

The 32nd district covers northern and eastern Dallas and its inner northern suburbs. The incumbent is Democrat Colin Allred, who flipped the district and was elected with 52.3% of the vote in 2018.

Democratic primary

Candidates

Nominee
Colin Allred, incumbent U.S. Representative

Primary results

Republican primary

Candidates

Nominee
Genevieve Collins, business executive

Eliminated in primary
Jon Hollis, film producer
Floyd McLendon, executive aide to Texas Attorney General Ken Paxton, Legislative Fellow, and retired U.S. Navy SEAL
Mark Sackett, structural engineer
Jeff Tokar, technical contractor

Declined
George Seay, businessman
Pete Sessions, former U.S Representative for Texas's 32nd congressional district

Polling

Primary results

Libertarian primary

Candidates

Declared 
 Christy Mowrey, executive director of education

Eliminated at convention 

 Ken Ashby, perennial candidate

Endorsements

General election

Predictions

Results

District 33

The 33rd district is located in the Dallas–Fort Worth metroplex, encompassing Downtown Fort Worth, western Dallas, and parts of Grand Prairie and Irving. The incumbent is Democrat Marc Veasey, who was re-elected with 76.2% of the vote in 2018.

Democratic primary

Candidates

Nominee
Marc Veasey, incumbent U.S. Representative

Eliminated in primary
Sean Paul Segura, activist

Primary results

Republican primary

Candidates

Nominee
Fabian Vasquez, business manager

Primary results

General election

Predictions

Results

District 34

The 34th district stretches from Brownsville in the Rio Grande Valley, northward into rural counties. The incumbent is Democrat Filemon Vela, who was elected with 60.0% of the vote in 2018.

Democratic primary

Candidates

Nominee
Filemon Vela, incumbent U.S. Representative

Eliminated in primary
Osbert Rodriguez Haro III, health consultant
Diego Zavala, high school teacher

Primary results

Republican primary

Candidates

Nominee
Rey Gonzalez, physician and nominee for Texas's 34th congressional district in 2016 and 2018

Eliminated in primary
Rod Lingsch, pilot

Primary results

General election

Predictions

Results

District 35

The 35th district connects eastern San Antonio to southeastern Austin, through the I-35 corridor. The incumbent is Democrat Lloyd Doggett, who was re-elected with 71.3% in 2018.

Democratic primary

Candidates

Nominee
Lloyd Doggett, incumbent U.S. Representative

Eliminated in primary
Rafael Alcoser, insurance broker

Primary results

Republican primary

Candidates

Nominee
Jennifer Garcia Sharon, volunteer caregiver

Eliminated in runoff
William Hayward, ostrich farmer

Eliminated in primary
Nick Moutos, attorney

Primary results

Runoff results

General election

Predictions

Results

District 36

The 36th district encompasses parts of Southeast Texas, including the Clear Lake region. The incumbent is Republican Brian Babin, who was re-elected with 72.6% of the vote in 2018.

Republican primary

Candidates

Nominee
Brian Babin, incumbent U.S. Representative

Eliminated in primary
RJ Boatman, former Chief of Police, Municipal Judge and business owner

Primary results

Democratic primary

Candidates

Nominee
Rashad Lewis, former Jasper city councilman

Primary results

General election

Predictions

Results

See also
 2020 Texas elections

Notes

Partisan clients

References

Further reading

External links
Elections Division at the Texas Secretary of State official website

  (State affiliate of the U.S. League of Women Voters)
 

Official campaign websites for 1st district candidates
 Hank Gilbert (D) for Congress
 Louie Gohmert (R) for Congress

Official campaign websites for 2nd district candidates
 Dan Crenshaw (R) for Congress
 Sima Ladjevardian (D) for Congress
 Elliott Scheirman (L) for Congress

Official campaign websites for 3rd district candidates
 Lulu Seikaly (D) for Congress
 Van Taylor (R) for Congress

Official campaign websites for 4th district candidates
 Lou Antonelli (L) for Congress
 Pat Fallon (R) for Congress
 Russell Foster (D) for Congress

Official campaign websites for 5th district candidates
 Lance Gooden (R) for Congress
 Kevin Hale (L) for Congress
 Carolyn Salter (D) for Congress

Official campaign websites for 6th district candidates
 Melanie Black (L) for Congress
 Stephen Daniel (D) for Congress
 Ron Wright (R) for Congress

Official campaign websites for 7th district candidates
 Lizzie Fletcher (D) for Congress
 Wesley Hunt (R) for Congress
 Shawn Kelly (L) for Congress 

Official campaign websites for 8th district candidates
 Kevin Brady (R) for Congress
 Elizabeth Hernandez (D) for Congress 

Official campaign websites for 9th district candidates
 Al Green (D) for Congress
 Joe Sosa (L) for Congress
 Johnny Teague (R) for Congress

Official campaign websites for 10th district candidates
 Roy Eriksen (L) for Congress
 Michael McCaul (R) for Congress
 Mike Siegel (D) for Congress

Official campaign websites for 11th district candidates
 Jeffery Cady (I) for Congress 
 Wacey Alpha Cody (L) for Congress 
 Jon Mark Hogg (D) for Congress 
 August Pfluger (R) for Congress

Official campaign websites for 12th district candidates
 Kay Granger (R) for Congress
 Trey Holcomb (L) for Congress 
 Lisa Welch (D) for Congress

Official campaign websites for 13th district candidates
 Ronny Jackson (R) for Congress
 Gus Trujillo (D) for Congress

Official campaign websites for 14th district candidates
 Adrienne Bell (D) for Congress
 Randy Weber (R) for Congress

Official campaign websites for 15th district candidates
 Monica de la Cruz-Hernandez (R) for Congress
 Vicente Gonzalez (D) for Congress

Official campaign websites for 16th district candidates
 Irene Armendariz-Jackson (R) for Congress
 Veronica Escobar (D) for Congress

Official campaign websites for 17th district candidates
 Ted Brown (L) for Congress
 Rick Kennedy (D) for Congress 
 Pete Sessions (R) for Congress

Official campaign websites for 18th district candidates
 Wendell Champion (R) for Congress
 Vince Duncan (I) for Congress
 Sheila Jackson Lee (D) for Congress
 Luke Spencer (L) for Congress

Official campaign websites for 19th district candidates
 Jodey Arrington (R) for Congress
 Tom Watson (D) for Congress

Official campaign websites for 20th district candidates
 Joaquin Castro (D) for Congress
 Mauro Garza (R) for Congress

Official campaign websites for 21st district candidates
 Wendy Davis (D) for Congress 
 Chip Roy (R) for Congress
 Tom Wakely (G) for Congress 

Official campaign websites for 22nd district candidates
 Sri Preston Kulkarni (D) for Congress
 Joseph LeBlanc Jr. (L) for Congress
 Troy Nehls (R) for Congress

Official campaign websites for 23rd district candidates
 Tony Gonzales (R) for Congress
 Gina Ortiz Jones (D) for Congress

Official campaign websites for 24th district candidates
 Mark Bauer (I) for Congress 
 Darren Hamilton (L) for Congress
 Steve Kuzmich (I) for Congress
 Candace Valenzuela (D) for Congress
 Beth Van Duyne (R) for Congress

Official campaign websites for 25th district candidates
 Bill Kelsey (L) for Congress
 Julie Oliver (D) for Congress
 Roger Williams (R) for Congress

Official campaign websites for 26th district candidates
 Mark Boler (L) for Congress
 Michael C. Burgess (R) for Congress
 Carol Iannuzzi (D) for Congress

Official campaign websites for 27th district candidates
 Michael Cloud (R) for Congress
 Ricardo "Rick" De La Fuente (D) for Congress
 Phil Gray (L) for Congress

Official campaign websites for 28th district candidates
 Henry Cuellar (D) for Congress
 Sandra Whitten (R) for Congress

Official campaign websites for 29th district candidates
 Jaimy Z. Blanco (R) for Congress
 Sylvia Garcia (D) for Congress
 Phil Kurtz (L) for Congress

Official campaign websites for 30th district candidates
 Eddie Bernice Johnson (D) for Congress
 Tre Pennie (R) for Congress
 Eric Williams (I) for Congress 

Official campaign websites for 31st district candidates
 Jeremy Bravo (I) for Congress
 John Carter (R) for Congress
 Donna Imam (D) for Congress
 Clark Patterson (L) for Congress

Official campaign websites for 32nd district candidates
 Colin Allred (D) for Congress
 Genevieve Collins (R) for Congress
 Christy Mowrey (L) for Congress 
 Jason Sigmon (I) for Congress

Official campaign websites for 33rd district candidates
 Fabian Vasquez (R) for Congress 
 Marc Veasey (D) for Congress
 Rene Welton (I) for Congress 

Official campaign websites for 34th district candidates
 Rey Gonzalez (R) for Congress
 Chris Royal (I) for Congress
 Filemon Vela Jr. (D) for Congress

Official campaign websites for 35th district candidates
 Lloyd Doggett (D) for Congress
 Jennifer Garcia Sharon (R) for Congress
 Mark Loewe (L) for Congress
 Jason Mata (I) for Congress

Official campaign websites for 36th district candidates
 Brian Babin (R) for Congress
 Rashad Lewis (D) for Congress
 Hal Ridley Jr. (G) for Congress

Texas
2020
House